Crossostemma is a genus of flowering plants belonging to the family Passifloraceae.

Its native range is Western Tropical Africa to Cameroon.

Species:
 Crossostemma laurifolium Planch. ex Benth.

References

Passifloraceae
Malpighiales genera